The main Victoria Harbour is in Hong Kong but may refer to:

Australia
 Docklands, Victoria, an inner city suburb in Melbourne, Victoria

Canada
 Tay, Ontario, a township which encompasses the hamlet of Victoria Harbour
 Victoria Harbour (British Columbia), a harbour, seaport, and seaplane airport
 Victoria Harbour, Nova Scotia, a community

See also
 Port of Victoria (disambiguation)
 Port Victoria (disambiguation)
 Victoria Quay (disambiguation)